April Margera (born March 28, 1956) is an American reality television personality who has appeared on MTV's Viva La Bam and Jackass, as well as the CKY videos, Haggard, Minghags and Bam's Unholy Union.

Biography
April Margera is married to Phil Margera and together they are the parents of skateboarder and Jackass star Bam Margera and CKY drummer Jess Margera. Jeff Tremaine, producer of Jackass, once referred to her as "everyone's mom", telling how she cooked dinner for the entire Jackass crew on their first trip to West Chester.

In 2006, she published a cookbook called April Cooks: There's an Alligator in My Kitchen, which is a play on the fact that Bam put an alligator in her kitchen as part of a skit on Jackass: The Movie (he was trying to make her swear because the movie would be uncensored). This was achieved in the film and in Jackass Number Two. In October 2007, she testified on behalf of the defense for her brother-in-law Vincent Margera's trial. 

In December 2011, it was announced that Margera had opened The Rose Hip Barn, along with her mother Velma and her daughter-in-law Kelly. The store, located in Thornton, Pennsylvania, sells refurbished furniture as well as homemade purses and accessories for the home.

In March 2016, April and Bam Margera appeared on the VH1 reality television show Family Therapy with Dr. Jenn to work on their relationship and confront Bam's alcoholism.

Filmography

Film

Television

References

External links 

1956 births
American hairdressers
American television personalities
American women television personalities
Living people
People from Delaware County, Pennsylvania
Women cookbook writers
CKY
21st-century American businesspeople
Jackass (TV series)